Fred Buttsworth (28 April 1880 – 26 February 1974) was an Australian cricketer. He played seven first-class matches for Western Australia between 1920/21 and 1925/26.

His sons, Wally and Fred, were also both talented footballers and cricketers.

See also
 List of Western Australia first-class cricketers

References

External links
 

1880 births
1974 deaths
Australian cricketers
Western Australia cricketers
Cricketers from New South Wales
Sportsmen from New South Wales